Siedlimowo (German 1939-1945 Siegersdorf)  is a village in the administrative district of Gmina Jeziora Wielkie, within Mogilno County, Kuyavian-Pomeranian Voivodeship, in north-central Poland.

The village has a population of 250.

References

Siedlimowo